Leomar José Pinto Blanco (born 17 March 1997) is a Venezuelan professional footballer who plays for Spanish club FC Cartagena B as a winger.

Club career
Born in Caracas, Pinto was a Caracas FC youth graduate. After making his senior debut with the reserves, he made his first team debut on 10 November 2013, coming on as a second-half substitute in a 2–2 home draw against Deportivo Petare. In March 2014, after impressing in 2013 FIFA U-17 World Cup, he had an 11-day trial at Arsenal.

Pinto scored his first professional goal on 19 November 2014, netting his team's only in a 1–2 away loss against Zamora FC. He was given his first start late in the month, in a 0–0 draw at Llaneros de Guanare.

In January 2016 Pinto moved abroad, signing for Elche CF. However, due to bureaucratic problems, he was only registered in August, being assigned to the reserves in Tercera División.

Pinto made his first team debut on 7 September 2016, replacing Liberto Beltrán in a 2–2 Copa del Rey away draw against CD Mirandés, as his side went through on penalties. The following 14 August, he was loaned to Segunda División B side Ontinyent CF.

On 29 August 2018, Pinto moved to another reserve team, Cádiz CF B in the fourth tier.

References

External links

1997 births
Living people
Footballers from Caracas
Venezuelan footballers
Association football wingers
Venezuelan Primera División players
Caracas FC players
Segunda División players
Segunda División B players
Tercera División players
Elche CF Ilicitano footballers
Elche CF players
Ontinyent CF players
Cádiz CF B players
FC Cartagena B players
FC Cartagena footballers
Venezuelan expatriate footballers
Venezuelan expatriate sportspeople in Spain
Expatriate footballers in Spain